Endometritis is inflammation of the inner lining of the uterus (endometrium). Symptoms may include fever, lower abdominal pain, and abnormal vaginal bleeding or discharge. It is the most common cause of infection after childbirth. It is also part of spectrum of diseases that make up pelvic inflammatory disease.

Endometritis is divided into acute and chronic forms. The acute form is usually from an infection that passes through the cervix as a result of an abortion, during menstruation, following childbirth, or as a result of douching or placement of an IUD. Risk factors for endometritis following delivery include Caesarean section and prolonged rupture of membranes. Chronic endometritis is more common after menopause. The diagnosis may be confirmed by endometrial biopsy. Ultrasound may be useful to verify that there is no retained tissue within the uterus.

Treatment is usually with antibiotics. Recommendations for treatment of endometritis following delivery includes clindamycin with gentamicin. Testing for and treating gonorrhea and chlamydia in those at risk is also recommended. Chronic disease may be treated with doxycycline. Outcomes with treatment are generally good.

Rates of endometritis are about 2% following vaginal delivery, 10% following scheduled C-section, and 30% with rupture of membranes before C-section if preventive antibiotics are not used. The term "endomyometritis" may be used when inflammation of the endometrium and the myometrium is present. The condition is also relatively common in other animals such as cows.

Symptoms
Symptoms may include fever, lower abdominal pain, and abnormal vaginal bleeding or discharge.

Types

Acute endometritis 
Acute endometritis is characterized by infection. The organisms most often isolated are believed to be because of compromised abortions, delivery, medical instrumentation, and retention of placental fragments. There is not enough evidence for the use of prophylactic antibiotics to prevent endometritis after manual removal of placental in vaginal birth. Histologically, neutrophilic infiltration of the endometrial tissue is present during acute endometritis. The clinical presentation is typically high fever and purulent vaginal discharge. Menstruation after acute endometritis is excessive and in uncomplicated cases can resolve after 2 weeks of clindamycin and gentamicin IV antibiotic treatment.

In certain populations, it has been associated with Mycoplasma genitalium and pelvic inflammatory disease.

Chronic endometritis 

Chronic endometritis is characterized by the presence of plasma cells in the stroma. Lymphocytes, eosinophils, and even lymphoid follicles may be seen, but in the absence of plasma cells, are not enough to warrant a histologic diagnosis. It may be seen in up to 10% of all endometrial biopsies performed for irregular bleeding. The most common organisms are Chlamydia trachomatis (chlamydia), Neisseria gonorrhoeae (gonorrhea), Streptococcus agalactiae (Group B Streptococcus), Mycoplasma hominis, tuberculosis, and various viruses. Most of these agents are capable of causing chronic pelvic inflammatory disease (PID). Patients with chronic endometritis may have an underlying cancer of the cervix or endometrium (although infectious cause is more common). Antibiotic therapy is curative in most cases (depending on underlying cause), with fairly rapid alleviation of symptoms after only 2 to 3 days. Women with chronic endometritis are also at a higher risk of pregnancy loss and treatment for this improves future pregnancy outcomes.

Chronic granulomatous endometritis is usually caused by tuberculous. The granulomas are small, sparse, and without caseation. The granulomas take up to 2 weeks to develop and since the endometrium is shed every 4 weeks, the granulomas are poorly formed.

In human medicine, pyometra (also a veterinary condition of significance) is regarded as a form of chronic endometritis seen in elderly women causing stenosis of the cervical os and accumulation of discharges and infection. Symptom in chronic endometritis is blood stained discharge but in pyometra the patient complaints of lower abdominal pain.

Pyometra 

Pyometra describes an accumulation of pus in the uterine cavity.  In order for pyometra to develop, there must be both an infection and blockage of cervix. Signs and symptoms include lower abdominal pain (suprapubic), rigors, fever, and the discharge of pus on introduction of a sound into the uterus. Pyometra is treated with antibiotics, according to culture and sensitivity.

See also
Maternal death
Puerperal fever

References

External links 

Inflammations
Inflammatory diseases of female pelvic organs
Theriogenology
Wikipedia medicine articles ready to translate